"Something Beautiful" is a 2003 song by Robbie Williams.

Something Beautiful may also refer to:

Music

Albums
Something Beautiful (Great Big Sea album) or the title song, 2004
Something Beautiful (Jordan Smith album), 2016
Something Beautiful, by Ernie Haase & Signature Sound, 2020
Something Beautiful, a video album by Gaither Homecoming, 1996

Songs
"Something Beautiful", by Cauterize, 2003
"Something Beautiful", by Connie Stevens, 1965
"Something Beautiful", by Detective, 1977
"Something Beautiful", by Duffy, 2020
"Something Beautiful", by the Equals, 1978
"Something Beautiful", by Jars of Clay from The Eleventh Hour, 2002
"Something Beautiful", by Needtobreathe from The Outsiders, 2009
"Something Beautiful", by Newsboys from Go, 2006
"Something Beautiful", by Todd Agnew from Reflection of Something, 2005
"Something Beautiful", by Tracy Bonham from Blink the Brightest, 2005
"Something Beautiful (To Remember)", by Slim Whitman, 1971
"Something Beautiful", by Tom Walker featuring Masked Wolf, 2021

Other uses
"Something Beautiful" (Better Call Saul), a television episode
Something Beautiful, a 2008 photobook by Zhang Jingna